{{DISPLAYTITLE:C12H17NO3}}
The molecular formula C12H17NO3 may refer to:

 Anhalidine
 Anhalinine
 Anhalonidine
 Bucetin
 Bufexamac
 Cerulenin
 Etamivan
 MEDA
 Methyl-MMDA-2
 MMDMA (drug)
 Methylenedioxyhydroxyethylamphetamine
 Rimiterol